Eupithecia anticura is a moth in the family Geometridae. It is found in the Region of Los Lagos (Osorno Province) in Chile. The habitat consists of the Valdivian Forest Biotic Province.

The length of the forewings is about 8.5 mm for females. The forewings are greyish white, with numerous dark grey and black scales, and with flesh colored scales along the veins, especially basally and distally. The hindwings are dark grey, with pale grey scaling. Adults have been recorded on wing in January.

Etymology
The specific name is based on the type locality.

References

Moths described in 1987
anticura
Moths of South America
Endemic fauna of Chile